Druz may refer to
 Druze, a Middle Eastern religious community
Druz-Iki, a village in Azerbaijan
Aleksandr Druz (born 1955), Russian television personality 
Émile Druz (1891–?), French racing cyclist